Dr. Sudoku may refer to:
Thomas Snyder or Dr. Sudoku, American puzzle creator
Dr. Sudoku (video game), a video game published by Mastiff